Savianges is a commune in the Saône-et-Loire department in the region of Bourgogne-Franche-Comté in eastern France.

Geography
The landscape is mainly composed of grass pastures and a hill named "Le bois Rougeon" overlooking the village. A river named "La Guye" is passing through from the north to the south. 
The main roads are connecting the village to Germagny to the south, Cersot to the north and Fley to the east.

History

Early history
Savianges gets its name from Gallo-Roman villa, named "Savianga Villa", its existence has been documented from the year 840.
A Roman road joining Autun to Mâcon via Saint-Gengoux, was passing through the land.

Recent History
Savianges used to have 308 people in 1827, the number felt to 187 en 1901 and 73 in 2009.
In the years 1870, François Dulac was Maire of Savianges and member of French Senate. As an architect he has built several schools and public buildings in Saône-et-Loire.
At this period Savianges had two schools : One public school built by Dulac and one Religious School (named Saint-Louis) build by Miss Julia de La Bussière for the Sisters of the Blessed Sacrament of Autun.

Main sights

 Savianges Middle Age Castle.
 15th century church modified by Dulac in the 19th century in a neo-renaissance Italian style. The church contains elements protected by French National Heritage as a Monument historique.
 Buildings by François Dulac architect (Former Public School, Former Vicarage).
 Wash House.

See also
Communes of the Saône-et-Loire department

References

Communes of Saône-et-Loire